The Whitehaven Academy (formerly Whitehaven School) is a comprehensive co-educational secondary school with academy status, located in Whitehaven, in west Cumbria, England. The school was established in 1984.

History
The Whitehaven School opened in 1984 taking pupils from the Whitehaven Grammar School which had moved to the Overend site in 1968, Overend School itself which had opened on this site in 1960, and Richmond Street Secondary Modern School which had occupied the former Grammar School site in 1969.

It had a full inspection in 2004 where it was described as a larger than average improving school. It noted "Its pupils’ socio-economic circumstances are well below average with an above average number known to be entitled to free school meals. Standards on entry to the school are below average; those of the boys are well below."
A February 2011 report from the Office for Standards in Education, Children's Services and Skills (Ofsted) said that then Whitehaven School has made inadequate progress in making improvements and demonstrating a better capacity for sustained improvement' in the previous two years, according to a report issued subsequent to an Ofsted team visit in January 2011. Lynette Norris, who took over as headteacher in 2011, was described as bringing 'vision and energy' to the school since she took office.

Whitehaven Academy
The school converted to academy status in January 2014, sponsored by the Bright Tribe Trust, and was renamed the Whitehaven Academy. The past records of school were obscured, it gained a new Ofsted Unique Reference Number and establishment number.

In January 2015 the trust announced that they had appointed Philip Grant as the new principal, who was moving to the academy from Newton Rigg College, Penrith  where he was the director of studies. Grant took up his position on 16 March 2015. Then Grant was replaced by Warren Turner for the academic year 2016/17. Turner had previously acted as principal at Richard Rose Morton Academy in Carlisle.

In November 2016 the school was placed in special measures following an Ofsted inspection.
Parents, teachers, and politicians were critical of the Bright Tribe Trust. The building was physically deteriorating and was not watertight. Staff and parents were concerned about the lack of teaching resources with some teachers printing exam practice papers at home using their own materials, such was the shortage in school. Staff raised their concerns writing directly to the Regional Schools Commissioner, Janet Renou, who claims she has been working with Bright Tribe and the Education and Skills Funding Agency to try to address the state of the building.

Parents and staff remained dissatisfied: one child was taken to hospital after being hit by falling debris, one lunch session being stopped because rain was dripping on to food and rainwater falling on to electric sockets. The staff explained that much of the building had to be cordoned off when it rained. A series of strikes was planned for December 2017 and January 2018 to highlight the need for a new sponsor.

On 30 November 2017 it was announced that a new sponsor would be found for the school, as the Bright Tribe Trust had relinquished control. The multi-academy trust, which runs nine other primary and secondary schools throughout Cumbria, confirmed that its chief operating officer was stepping down. It also pulled out of a proposed sponsorship for Haydon Bridge High School in Northumberland, as the school was running an increasing financial deficit.
Bright Tribe blames its failure on "historical underinvestment before its involvement". 
Janet Renou said "...it is clear that a new sponsor is required to deliver the improvement needed to ensure pupils get the education they deserve – and the process of identifying an alternative is under way."

In 2018 it emerged that the Bright Tribe Trust had taken the money intended for repairs to the school, and then not carried out the work; the Conservative government, which had approved the academy initiative, had been warned about the problems in 2015, but had taken no action. Michael Dwan, the founder of Bright Tribe Trust and had previously made over a hundred million pounds from similar arrangements in NHS provision, said "I am not in control of the trusts and never have been."

December 2017

The school was in limbo, it did not have the option to return to local authority control. It could not make long-term planning decisions, hire new permanent members of staff or organise pay rises. The government struggled to find a new chain willing and able to take on the school, which is in a precarious financial position.

As of 3 December 2017, 64 academy status schools are waiting to find a new sponsor after being abandoned by, or relinquished by their managing trust. Using average enrolments of 279 pupils for state primary schools and 946 for state secondary schools this would mean over 40,000 students are affected.

In mid 2018 the new sponsor for The Whitehaven Academy was named as Cumbria Education Trust, shortly afterwards it was announced that headteacher Warren Turner had resigned and Assistant Headteacher Andrea Bateson was taking over on an interim basis.

Curriculum
In years 7 and 8, and in most cases year 9 students study the core subjects of the National Curriculum :English, Maths, Science and PE, and a range of other subjects to build core competencies and prepare for Key Stage 4. This is Key Stage 3. In Key Stage 4, years 10, 11 and some accelerated year 9 students study the core subjects alongside a range of options. These subjects are academic, vocational or a mixture of the two. This ensures they gain the necessary qualifications of 'Five As to Cs including Maths and English' which the government requires.

Key Stage 5 (Sixth Form) courses are provided for students who choose to continue their study at the academy. They have opportunity to study for AS Levels, A2 Levels and BTEC qualifications.

Sixth form
In September 2020 a new level of co-operation began with the initiation of the West Coast Sixth Form. Students from Whitehaven and Workington wanting to enter one of the three pathways of sixth-form education - Academic, Vocational and Other - will study in a combined sixth form with a free bus service between the two sites. New facilities in Whitehaven are due to open in Spring of 2022.

Notable former pupils 
 James Donaldson, professional rugby player
 Steve McCurrie, rugby player
 Gregg McNally, rugby player
 Jamie Reed, Labour MP from 2005 to January 2017 for Copeland
 Cory Spedding, Junior Eurovision singer in the 2004 contest

Whitehaven County Grammar School
 Tony Cooper, General Secretary from 1991 of the Engineers' and Managers' Association, then of Prospect from 2001–02, then Chairman from 2002-05 of the Nuclear Industry Association (NIA), and father of Yvette Cooper, Labour MP since 2010 for Normanton, Pontefract and Castleford and former Secretary of State for Work and Pensions
 Robert Fell CB CBE, Chief Executive from 1975-82 of the London Stock Exchange
 Jim Graham OBE, Managing Director from 1982-96 of Border Television, then Chief Executive from 1996–98
 Prof Peter Halfpenny, Professor of Sociology from 1993-2010 at the University of Manchester
 Alf Parrish, Chief Constable from 1981-85 of Derbyshire Constabulary
 Sir Derek Pattinson, Secretary-General from 1972-90 of the General Synod
 Tom Rawling, poet
 Cyril Hazard, radio astronomer.

References

External links 
The Whitehaven Academy official site

Secondary schools in Cumbria
Academies in Cumbria
Whitehaven
Educational institutions established in 1984
1984 establishments in England